Sun Sumei may refer to:

Sun Sumei (engineer), Singaporean engineer
Sun Sumei (athlete) (born 1968), Chinese Olympic sprinter